Electronic Systems may refer to:

 Electronics and related technologies
 Electrical element
 Electrical network
 Electronic system-level design and verification

Organizations
 Goodrich Electronic Systems, a division of the Goodrich Corporation
 Marconi Electronic Systems, a former business of General Electric; now part of BAE Systems
 Northrop Grumman Electronic Systems
 Electronic Systems, a former business of Raytheon
 Electronic Systems Center, a unit of the United States Air Force located at Hanscom AFB

See also
 Electronic Music Systems (disambiguation)
 Electronic System, a Belgian musical group